The Gettysburg, PA Micropolitan Statistical Area is a small urban area of southern Pennsylvania.  Adams County makes up the entire statistical area.  The population is 101,407 as of the 2010 census.  The statistical area ranks 42nd in the U.S, and 4th in the State of Pennsylvania's micropolitan areas. Only East Stroudsburg, Chambersburg, and Pottsville are ahead of the Gettysburg Micropolitan Area.

Cities and towns
Cities
none

Major Boroughs and CDPs
Gettysburg Borough Pop. 7,620
Littlestown Borough Pop. 4,434
Carroll Valley Borough Pop. 3,876
McSherrystown Borough Pop. 3,038
Lake Meade CDP Pop. 2,563
Midway CDP Pop. 2,125
Bonneauville Borough Pop. 1,800
New Oxford Borough Pop. 1,783
East Berlin Borough Pop. 1,521
Lake Heritage CDP Pop. 1,333
Biglerville Borough Pop. 1,200
Abbottstown Borough Pop. 1,011

Map of Gettysburg, PA Micropolitan Statistical Area

See also
 List of micropolitan statistical areas

External links
 naco.org
 quickfacts.census.gov 

Geography of Adams County, Pennsylvania
Micropolitan areas of Pennsylvania